The Thirteenth Juror is a 1927 American mystery film directed by Edward Laemmle and written by Charles Logue and Walter Anthony. It is based on the 1908 play Counsel for the Defense by Henry Irving Dodge. The film stars Anna Q. Nilsson, Francis X. Bushman, Walter Pidgeon, Martha Mattox, Sidney Bracey and Sailor Sharkey. The film was released on November 13, 1927, by Universal Pictures.

Cast         
Anna Q. Nilsson as Helen Marsden
Francis X. Bushman as Henry Desmond
Walter Pidgeon as Richard Marsden
Martha Mattox as The Housekeeper
Sidney Bracey as The Butler
Sailor Sharkey as The Prisoner
Lloyd Whitlock as The District Attorney
George Siegmann as The Politician, George Quinn
Fred Kelsey as The Detective

References

External links
 

1927 films
American mystery films
1927 mystery films
Universal Pictures films
Films directed by Edward Laemmle
American silent feature films
American black-and-white films
1920s English-language films
1920s American films
Silent mystery films